Andin Rashica (born September 19, 1990, in Gjilan) is a Kosovan professional basketball coach who is currently the lead assistant coach for Sigal Prishtina.

Coaching career
Rashica started as an assistant coach in 2006 and youth coach in 2009. He was an assistant to Arben Krasniqi and Fikret Shatri at Sigal Prishtina, before moving in 2013 to the KB RTV21, together with Krasniqi. He remained in the KB RTV21 after Krasniqi left and on February 2, 2014, at the age of 23, he was appointed head coach, being the youngest coach in Kosovo to lead a professional club.

He started to focus as a coach and was impressed for a short and successful time at this club, but for some unpublished reasons, RTV21 no longer participates in competitions organized by the Basketball Federation of Kosovo.

On September 2, 2014, Rashica started working as a basketball analyst and sports journalist at RTV21.

After a year break from the job of a basketball coach, Rashica on August 20, 2015 returns to Sigal Prishtina as an assistant coach. During this time, he sometimes takes over the running of the club as a head coach.

On January 11, 2018, he was appointed head coach of Sigal Prishtina. Andin Rashica recently won the first trophy as head coach of Prishtina with all local players. He became the youngest coach in the history of Kosovo basketball, winning the Kosovo Cup only at the age of 27.  
In 2020, Rashica is again appointed head coach of Prishtina, winning the Kosovo Super Cup again with all local players.

National team coaching career
Rashica was also part of the Kosovo national basketball team as an assistant coach from the first qualifying matches of 2016 until January 2020.

References

1990 births
Living people